Semi-Monde is a play written by Noël Coward in 1926, but not produced until 1977. Set in the lobby, restaurants, and bar of an up-scale Paris hotel (probably the Hôtel Ritz), the play follows the lives of a variety of socialites over a three-year period from 1924 to 1926. It is remarkable among its contemporaries due to its prominent treatment of sexuality, including homosexuality. This, however, is but the facade of Coward's exploration of the disconnected monotony of the lives of the elite.

The play, directed by Philip Prowse, was first produced in 1977 by the Glasgow Citizen's Theatre. The English premiere was produced by the Crescent Theatre, Birmingham, in 1979. It has been produced only once since, in 2001 by Thelma Holt, Karl Sydow and Bill Kenwright at the Lyric Theatre, London, also directed by Prowse. No further professional performances are known of; the only other production recorded was a production by Arts Canterbury in Ottawa in 2006.  In addition, it was also produced as a public performance at Mountview Academy of Theatre Arts, London in the autumn of 2004 and the Central School of Speech and Drama, London, between 28 February and 3 March 2007.

Significance
Noël Coward, it is assumed, knew that Semi-Monde could not be produced in the environment of censorship that existed in the 1920s. However, in private correspondence, Coward described it as "jagged with sophistication", and sought to have it produced in Germany. It has been put forward that Semi-Monde is Coward's personal exploration of the high society of which he was a member.

Characters
Semi-Monde follows almost thirty characters through short scenes of two or three characters. Almost all of the action is implied.

Luke Bellows, a male.
Mike Craven, male, initially involved with Dorothy Price.
Joshua Drake, a male.
Violet Emery, a female.
Marion Fawcett, a female between thirty and forty.
Suzanne Fellini, a female friend of Dorothy Price.
Beryl Fletcher, a female of about nineteen. Involved first with Harry Leftwich, then George Hudd.
Beverly Ford, a male of about forty.
Cynthia Gable, a female. Initially involved with Inez Zulieta.
Cyril Hardacre, a male in his twenties.
Albert Hennick, a male of about twenty-eight.
George Hudd, a male.
Jerome Kennedy, male, father of Norma.
Norma Kennedy, daughter of Jerome.
Julius Levenovitch, a Russian male.
Harry Leftwich, a male of about forty-five.
Owen Marshall, a male of about thirty. Married to Tanis Marshall.
Tanis Marshall, a woman married to Owen Marshall.
Freddy Palmer, a male.
Dorothy Price, a female initially involved with Mike Craven. Later involved with Julius.
Benny Tyrell, a male.
Elise Trent, a female.
Inez Zulieta, a female, slightly older than Cynthia Gable.
Other characters: there are numerous other characters, including passersby, unnamed and minor characters, and a host of barmen, waiters, maitres d', bellhops, and the like.

Performances
1977, Glasgow Citizens' Theatre
1979, The Crescent Theatre, Birmingham
1989, Royalty Theatre, London
2000, Squeaky Quean Productions/GREX, Seattle
2001, London Lyric Theatre
2004, Judi Dench Theatre, Mountview Academy of Theatre Arts, London.
2006, Arts Canterbury Productions, Ottawa. See the production's website for more information.
2007, Embassy Theatre, Central School of Speech and Drama, London
2008, Guildhall School of Music and Drama
2014, The Oxford Playhouse
2017, The Ustinov Studio, Bath Spa University, Bath
2017, Santa Monica College, Bath Spa University & Santa Monica College, Los Angeles

In popular culture
Semi-Monde is referenced in the chorus of the 1981 Simple Minds title track "Sons & Fascination": "Ma son, warm land, Semi-Monde".

References

Semi-Monde, Methuen Publishing Ltd 2003.
Glasgow Citizen's Theatre Semi-Monde
Theatreguide London review, 2001
Arts Canterbury's Semi-Monde

1926 plays
Plays by Noël Coward
Paris in fiction
Plays set in France
LGBT-related plays